White Bear is the second studio album by British rock band the Temperance Movement.
The album was produced in 2015 and released on 15 January 2016.

Track listing
All songs written by the Temperance Movement.

Personnel
The Temperance Movement
 Phil Campbell — vocals
 Luke Potashnick — guitars
 Paul Sayer — guitars
 Nick Fyffe — bass
 Damon Wilson — drums

Production
 The Temperance Movement — production
 Sam Miller — production, recording, mixing
 John Davis — mastering

Design
 Steven Sebring — cover image and photography
 Graham Erickson — art direction

References

2016 albums
The Temperance Movement albums
Earache Records albums